Frank A. Palen House is a historic home located at Kingston in Ulster County, New York.  It is a Queen Anne style residence built in 1892.

It was listed on the National Register of Historic Places in 2005.

References

Houses on the National Register of Historic Places in New York (state)
Queen Anne architecture in New York (state)
Houses completed in 1892
Houses in Ulster County, New York
National Register of Historic Places in Ulster County, New York